Miroslav Antonov (born 10 March 1986) is a Bulgarian footballer who currently  plays as a forward for Aiolikos FC in Greece.

Career
Antonov had previously played for Minyor Bobov dol and Montana.

Sportist Svoge
In summer 2008, he signed with Sportist Svoge. In the 2008–09 season, Antonov helped the team with his goals gain promotion to the first division in Bulgaria. He scored 15 goals in 29 matches.

In the first half of the next season he earned 15 appearances playing in the A PFG, scoring five goals.

Levski Sofia
On 4 January 2010, Levski Sofia signed Antonov on a three-year deal for  € 50 000. He chose to wear the kit number 19. On 10 February 2010, Antonov scored his first goal for Levski in the 1:0 win against Belarusian side Dinamo Minsk in a friendly match.

Antonov made his official debut for Levski on 7 March 2010 against Minyor Pernik. The result of the match was 3–1 for Levski.

In the 2009–10 season, after couple of bad games and results, Levski however achieved qualification for UEFA Europa League becoming 3rd in the final ranking.

Montana (loan)
On 13 July 2010, Antonov was sent on loan to his former club PFC Montana.

On 15 January 2014 moved to Maccabi Yavne from the Israeli National League 2.

Montana
On 17 July 2017, Antonov signed a 1-year contract with his hometown club Montana.

Aiolikos
At the end of January 2020, Antonov moved to Greece where he joined Aiolikos in the Gamma Ethniki. He played two games before he got injured and didn't play again until the summer 2020, also due to the COVID-19 pandemic.

Playing style
A tall and physically imposing forward with a good heading ability, Antonov has been likened to Georgi Chilikov.

References

External links
 
 Profile at Levskisofia.info

1986 births
Living people
People from Montana, Bulgaria
Bulgarian footballers
Bulgarian expatriate footballers
FC Montana players
FC Sportist Svoge players
PFC Levski Sofia players
PFC Ludogorets Razgrad players
PFC Slavia Sofia players
Maccabi Yavne F.C. players
Hapoel Bnei Lod F.C. players
Hapoel Nir Ramat HaSharon F.C. players
Aiolikos F.C. players
First Professional Football League (Bulgaria) players
Second Professional Football League (Bulgaria) players
Liga Leumit players
Expatriate footballers in Israel
Expatriate footballers in Greece
Bulgarian expatriate sportspeople in Israel
Bulgarian expatriate sportspeople in Greece
Association football forwards